The 2022 Panthers Wrocław season is the second season of the Panthers Wrocław team in the European League of Football, after moving over from the Polish league LFA in 2021.

Preseason
Shortly after the end of the 2021 European League of Football season the franchise announced the re-hiring of head coach Jakub Samel. The first player signed for the upcoming season was former Clemson Tigers football captain Darius Robinson. In the beginning of 2022 the Panthers acquired the services of Gary Kubiak as a football advisor for players and coaching staff. On the other side, the franchise lost three already signed players Keanu Ebanks, KaVonte Turpin and Tadhg Leader as well as coach Jeff Jagodzinski to USFL and CFL teams.

Regular season

Standings

Schedule
 
Source: europeanleague.football

Roster

Transactions
From Hamburg Sea Devils: Keanu Ebanks (December 22, 2021)

Staff

Notes

References 

Panthers Wrocław
Panthers Wrocław
Panthers Wrocław